Boris Gaquere is a classical guitarist.

Gaquere was born in Brussels in 1977. He has also performed in guitar-duo formation with Denis Sung-Hô and now often collaborates with the Brazilian percussionist Renato Martins.

Recordings
Obrigado (Gaquere / Sung-Hô) (Chamber, CH207)
Xeque-Mate (VGo Recordings VG1004)
Carpe Diem (VGo Recordings VG1010)
Tempo Feliz (Gaquere / Martins), f010

References

External links
Official Homepage
Myspace: Boris Gaquere
Myspace: Duo Gaquere Martins

1977 births
Living people
Belgian classical guitarists
21st-century guitarists